Doctor Who: The Monthly Adventures, formerly titled the Main Range, is a series that consists of full-cast audio dramas based on the British science fiction television programme Doctor Who, produced by Nicholas Briggs and Big Finish Productions and starring one of the original actors to play The Doctor on television in the classic era of the programme. The main audio series currently feature the Fifth, Sixth and Seventh Doctors, and have since developed the pattern of thirteen releases per year, one every month with two in September or December. In May 2020, Big Finish announced that the Main Range would conclude with its 275th release in March 2021, to be replaced with regular releases of each Doctor in their own boxsets throughout the year from January 2022. With 275 releases over 22 years, in 2021 the series achieved the Guinness World Record for longest running science fiction audio play series.

Big Finish Productions began producing audio dramas featuring the Fifth Doctor, Sixth Doctor, and Seventh Doctors, starting with The Sirens of Time in July 1999. This continued through to 2000, and from 2001 to 2007, the main range also included releases featuring the Eighth Doctor with his companions Charley Pollard and C'rizz, but these were ended due to the simultaneously-running Eighth Doctor Adventures, which ran from 2006 to 2011 and featured companion Lucie Miller. From 2008 to late 2011, only one Eighth Doctor release was produced for the main range: The Company of Friends, featuring companions from other media to the audio plays and the historical figure Mary Shelley. The Eighth Doctor returned to the main range in a trilogy of adventures with Mary Shelley in October 2011.

Cast

Notable Guests

 Nicholas Courtney and Jon Culshaw as Brigadier Lethbridge-Stewart
 Lalla Ward as Romana
 Louise Jameson as Leela
 John Leeson as K9
 Frazer Hines as Jamie McCrimmon
 Katy Manning as Jo Grant and Iris Wildthyme
 Richard Franklin as Mike Yates
 Peter Purves as Steven Taylor
 Maureen O'Brien as Vicki
 Ian McNeice as Winston Churchill
 Robert Jezek as Frobisher
 Lisa Bowerman as Bernice Summerfield
 Miles Richardson as Irving Braxiatel
 Anna Hope as DI Menzies
 John Picard as Thomas Brewster
 Julie Cox as Mary Shelley
 Maggie O'Neill as Lysandra Aristedes
 Nicola Walker as Liv Chenka
 Amy Pemberton as Sally Morgan
 Christian Edwards as Will Arrowsmith
 George Watkins as Marc
 Geoffrey Beevers, Alex Macqueen, and James Dreyfus as The Master
 Don Warrington as Rassilon
 Ian Collier as Omega
 Terry Molloy as Davros
 Nabil Shaban as Sil
 Siobhan Redmond as The Rani
 Graeme Garden and Rufus Hound as The Monk
 Mark Bonnar as The Eleven
 Nicholas Briggs as the Daleks, Cybermen, and Ice Warriors

Releases

1999

2000

2001

2002

2003

2004

2005

2006

2007

2008

2009

2010

2011

2012

2013

2014

2015

2016

2017

2018

2019

2020

2021

Continuation
In May 2020, Big Finish announced that the Main Range would conclude with its 275th release in March 2021, to be replaced with regular releases of each Doctor in their own boxsets throughout the year from January 2022. The new boxsets for each Doctor were announced in May 2021. With the exception of the Second Doctor, Big Finish already produced boxset ranges for each Doctor. The First, Third, Fourth and Eighth Doctor Adventures ranges enjoyed regular releases by the time the Monthly Adventures ended, whereas the Fifth, Sixth and Seventh Doctor Adventures ranges had only occasional releases prior to these series being relaunched.

Notes

World records

References 

 
Big Finish Productions
Doctor Who spin-offs